Paul Louis Wanninger (December 12, 1902 – March 7, 1981) was a backup shortstop in Major League Baseball who played in  and  for the New York Yankees (1925), Boston Red Sox (1927) and Cincinnati Reds (1927).

A native of Birmingham, Alabama, Wanninger is best known as the player who ended one consecutive-game streak and helped start another. As a rookie, he replaced Everett Scott at shortstop for the Yankees on May 5, 1925 to end Scott's then major league record of 1,307 consecutive games. On June 1, 1925 Lou Gehrig started his famous 2,130 game consecutive streak when he pinch hit for Wanninger. For the season, Wanninger had a .247 average in a career-high 117 games.

Wanninger returned to the minor leagues for all of 1926. He was on the 1927 Red Sox Opening Day lineup and was obtained by Cincinnati in midseason. In a two-season career, Wanninger was a .234 hitter (130-for-556) with one home run and 31 RBI in 163 games, including 53 runs, 15 doubles, eight triples and five stolen bases.

He died at the age of 78 in North Augusta, South Carolina.

See also
1925 events in baseball
1927 Boston Red Sox season

External links

Retrosheet

1902 births
1981 deaths
Boston Red Sox players
Cincinnati Reds players
New York Yankees players
Major League Baseball shortstops
Baseball players from Alabama
Minor league baseball managers
Okmulgee Drillers players
Augusta Tygers players
St. Paul Saints (AA) players
Louisville Colonels (minor league) players
Milwaukee Brewers (minor league) players
Augusta Tigers players
Anniston Rams players
Selma Cloverleafs players